The Isotope is an American catamaran sailing dinghy that was designed by Frank Meldau as a one-design racer and first built in 1962.

The design is the larger stablemate of the Cheshire 14 catamaran.

Production
The design is built by Fiberglass Unlimited (now called Custom Fiberglass International) in Wake Forest, North Carolina, United States. A total of 710 have been built and the design remains in production.

Design
The Isotope is a recreational sailboat, built predominantly of fiberglass. It has a fractional sloop rig, with aluminum spars, a sealed rotating mast and fully battened mainsail, with eight ash wood or fiberglass battens. The hulls have spooned raked stems, vertical transoms, transom-hung, kick-up rudders controlled by a tiller and retractable, self-tending centerboards. The hulls are joined with three cross-members. There are two stowage compartments, with hatches. The boat displaces  and has flotation for positive buoyancy, plus a righting bar.

For sailing the design may be equipped with options such as a mast limiter, roller furling jib and a trapeze.

The design has a Portsmouth Yardstick racing average handicap of 74.0. It is normally raced with a crew of one sailor although it can carry three people.

Operational history
In a 1994 review Richard Sherwood wrote, "sister to the Cheshire, the Isotope is two feet longer and five
Portsmouth numbers faster."

See also
List of sailing boat types
List of multihulls

Related development
Cheshire 14

References

External links

Dinghies
Catamarans
1960s sailboat type designs
Sailboat type designs by Frank Meldau
Sailboat types built by Custom Fiberglass International
Sailboat types built by Fiberglass Unlimited